Dragan Kruscić (born December 3, 1986) is a Serbian professional basketball player Sutjeska.

Playing career 
A shooting guard, Kruscić played for OKK Beograd, Metalac, Tamiš, and a Montenegrin team Sutjeska.

External links
 Player Profile at eurobasket.com
 Player Profile at proballers.com
 Player Profile at basketball.realgm.com

1986 births
Living people
KK Metalac Valjevo players
KK Sutjeska players
KK Tamiš players
OKK Beograd players
Sportspeople from Peja
Serbian men's basketball players
Serbian expatriate basketball people in Montenegro
Shooting guards